Astapa drewi is a moth of the family Notodontidae. It is found in north-eastern Ecuador.

The length of the forewings is about 15 mm. The ground colour of the forewings is a mixture of olive drab and mossy green, broadly suffused with reddish brown along the anal margin. The ground colour of the hindwings is purplish grey.

The larvae probably feed on Geonoma species.

Etymology
The species is named in honour of Andrew "Drew" Townsend, who served as manager of the Yanayacu Biological Station from January 2009 to December 2009.

References

Moths described in 2011
Notodontidae
Moths of South America